William Richard Wood Stephens (5 October 1839 – 22 December 1902) was Dean of Winchester from 1895 to 1902.

Career
Stephens was born in Gloucestershire in 1839  the youngest son of Charles Stephens, a banker. He was educated privately before proceeding to Balliol College, Oxford, where he graduated in 1862 with a first class in Literae humaniores. 
Ordained deacon in 1864 and  a priest in 1865. He started his career with a curacy in Staines. In 1866 he became the curate of Purley, Berkshire. On 31 August 1869 he married Charlotte Jane Hook, the youngest daughter of Walter Farquhar Hook, the dean of Chichester. With Dean Hook's recommendation he became vicar of Mid-Lavant from 1870 to 1873, and lectured at Chichester Theological College from 1872 to 1876. In 1875 the Bishop of Chichester  gave him the prebend of Wittering, in the cathedral, to which a theological lectureship was attached. In 1876 he became the Rector of  Woolbeding, near Midhurst. In 1880 he was chosen by the clergy of Chichester Diocese as their proctor in Convocation. Then in 1894, when the Dean of Winchester (George Kitchin) became dean of Durham, Stephens was nominated to replace him as the dean of Winchester. In 1895 he was elevated to the Deanery at Winchester. When he took over it seems that the funds of the chapter were much reduced, and so  'private' resources were needed to support his position. He remained as dean of Winchester until his death.

Stephens was known for his philanthropy, spending his own money to have the church at Mid Lavant restored. He provided funds for the rebuilding of the chancel at Woolbeding and contributed to the repairs of the roof at Winchester Cathedral. He also spent a lot of time showing visitors around the cathedral and explaining its history. In 1895 he was recognised for his interest in history when he was elected a Fellow of the Society of Antiquaries.

In 1902 Stephens attended a mayoral banquet, in Winchester, where he consumed some oysters. Unfortunately the beds, in Emsworth where the oysters were sourced, had been contaminated with raw sewage.  Consequently, many of the guests, including Stephens, contracted food poisoning. His death in Winchester deanery, on 22 December 1902, about six weeks after the banquet, was attributed to  Typhoid Fever as a result of eating infected Emsworth oysters. He was buried in the graveyard of Winchester Cathedral on 27 December 1902.

Publications
 Life and Times of St John Chrysostom, 1872
 Memorials of the South Saxon See, 1876
 Christianity and Islam, 1877
 Life and Letters of W. F. Hook, DD, 1878, 4th edn 1881
 Memoir of William Page Baron Hatherley, 1883
 Hildebrand and His Times, 1888
 Helps to the Study of the Prayer-Book, 1891
 Life and Letters of E. A. Freeman, DCL, 1895
 Memoir of Richard Durnford, DD, sometime Bishop of Chichester, 1899
 Joint Editor with Rev. W. Hunt, A History of the English Church, (Journal), 1899-1910

Notes

External links

 

1839 births
Alumni of Balliol College, Oxford
Deans of Winchester
1902 deaths
Deaths from food poisoning
Deaths from typhoid fever